John Reynolds is a record producer. He was the first husband of singer Sinéad O'Connor; they have one child, Jake. Reynolds, formerly a drummer for the solo musician, Jah Wobble, met O'Connor and recorded her first album, The Lion and the Cobra in 1987, and has since collaborated on her I Do Not Want What I Haven't Got (1990), Universal Mother (1994) (for which he was nominated as Q Producer of the Year), the Gospel Oak EP  (1997), How About I Be Me (And You Be You)? (2012), and I'm Not Bossy, I'm the Boss (2014).

Reynolds was the drummer for O'Connor's band on her tour of 2013.

He has produced number one hits with Damien Dempsey. He produced the charity song The Ballad of Ronnie Drew by U2, The Dubliners, Kíla, and "A Band of Bowsies" which went straight to number 1 in the Irish single charts. He has recently recorded Herbie Hancock, Indigo Girls and Brian Eno for their July 2011 albums.

Reynolds produced the seventh Belinda Carlisle album, Voila. He has produced a new album Lifelines by Andrea Corr in 2011.

John also produced the Emmy Award Winning 'Music of Ireland' companion CD to a two-part PBS documentary series (Welcome Home and Welcome to America) celebrating 50 years of contemporary Irish music, its impact on America and its influence throughout the world. Each program features exclusive interviews, intimate performances and archival clips from some of the greatest Irish artists of our time including: The Chieftains, The Clancy Brothers, The Dubliners, U2, The Cranberries, Celtic Woman, Riverdance, Sinéad O'Connor, Bob Geldof and many others.

Artists produced include:
Sinéad O'Connor – "Song to the Siren"
The Chieftains and Moya Brennan – "Lullaby for the Dead"
Damien Rice – "Under the Tongue"
Liam Clancy featuring John Sheahan – "The Parting Glass"
Orla Fallon and Moya Brennan – "Forgotten"
Glen Hansard – "High Hope"
Damien Dempsey – "Maasai Returns"
Andrea Corr – "Oh Brother"
Andy Irvine and Dónal Lunny – "Blacksmith"
Paul Brady – "Dreams Will Come"
Shane MacGowan and Moya Brennan – "You're the One"
Anúna and Moya Brennan featuring Iarla Ó Lionáird – "Is Mise 'n Ghaoth/The Lass of Aughrim"
Belinda Carlisle – "Voila"
Screaming Orphans - "Life in a Carnival"

John co-produced with Brian Eno From Africa With Fury: Rise (2011) with Seun Kuti, son of Fela Kuti.

References

External links 
 
 

Irish record producers
Year of birth missing (living people)
Living people
Indigo Girls members